Silver Lake is an American global private equity firm focused on investments in technology, technology-enabled and related industries. Founded in 1999, the firm is one of the largest technology investors in the world. Its investment holdings have included Airbnb, Alibaba Group, Ancestry.com, Broadcom, Credit Karma, City Football Group, Dell Technologies, Endeavor, Expedia Group, Fanatics, First Advantage, Flixbus, Global Blue, GoDaddy, Jio, Lightbox, grupo BC de Asesoría Hipotecaria S.L., Motorola Solutions, New Zealand Rugby, NortonLifeLock, Red Ventures, Sabre Corporation, Skype, SoFi, GLG, Seagate Technology, SolarWinds, TEG, Twitter, Unity Technologies, Waymo, Weld North Education, WP Engine, Vacasa, the A-League football competition in Australia, and ZPG. Silver Lake is headquartered in Silicon Valley, and has offices in New York, London and Hong Kong.

History

Silver Lake was founded in 1999, at the height of the late 1990s technology boom to make private equity investments in mature technology companies as opposed to the startups pursued actively by venture capitalists. Among the firm's founders were Jim Davidson who had led the Technology Investment Banking business at Hambrecht & Quist; David Roux who had an operational and entrepreneurial background having served as chairman and CEO of Liberate Technologies, executive vice president at Oracle Corporation and senior vice president at Lotus Development; Roger McNamee, as the representative of Integral Capital Partners, a hybrid investment fund that made investments in publicly traded companies and venture capital investments in early-stage startups; and Glenn Hutchins, who came from Blackstone Group and served as a Special Advisor on economic and healthcare policy in the early Clinton Administration and previously worked at Thomas H. Lee Partners.

The firm raised its first fund, Silver Lake Partners, with $2.3 billion of investor commitments. Silver Lake's first fund was among the best performing funds of its vintage.

The firm's second fund, Silver Lake Partners II was raised in 2004 with $3.6 billion of commitments.

The firm's third fund, Silver Lake Partners III was raised in 2007 with $9.6 billion of commitments.  Also in 2007, the firm launched a middle-market investment business, Silver Lake Sumeru, hiring Ajay Shah and the former investment team of Shah Capital Partners. Sumeru completed fundraising for its debut fund in 2008 with $1.1 billion of capital.

In 2011, Silver Lake Kraftwerk was launched to provide growth capital to later-stage companies in technology and tech-enabled businesses across the operations, energy, and resources industries.

After the sale of Skype to Microsoft in 2011, Silver Lake was accused of unfairly depriving Skype employees of an options windfall. At issue was a clause in the Skype employee stock option grant agreement. The repurchase right gave Skype the authority to buy back shares at the grant price, when an employee left the company, even when those shares were vested.

In 2013, the firm raised its fourth fund, Silver Lake Partners IV, which closed in 2013 with $10.3 billion in committed capital.

In 2017, the firm raised its fifth fund, Silver Lake Partners V, which closed at $15 billion of commitments. Jim Davidson retired from the managing partner committee.

In September 2020, it was announced that Silver Lake was having negotiations to invest over $1 billion in Indian retail company Reliance Retail.

In 2021, Silver Lake purchased a minority 33.3% stake in the Australian Professional Leagues, otherwise known as the APL. The group is responsible for organising Australia's national association football leagues, being the A-League Men, A-League Women and A-League Youth. Silver Lake has estimated the value of the APL and its affiliate holdings at over US$300 million.

Key personnel 
In December 2019, Silver Lake appointed Egon Durban and Greg Mondre as Co-CEOs and promoted Joe Osnoss to managing partner. Silver Lake announced Ken Hao as chairman and Mike Bingle vice chairman and managing partner emeritus, with the launch of Silver Lake Partners VI.

Investments
Since 1999, Silver Lake made investments through leveraged buyout transactions, minority growth investments and private investment in public equity (PIPE) investments.
The following table details some of Silver Lake's private equity investments:

Investment strategies
Silver Lake operates through four primary strategies, all focused on technology investments:
 Silver Lake Partners makes private equity investments in large-cap technology and tech-enabled companies. Silver Lake Partners comprises the bulk of the firm's assets under management.
 Silver Lake Alpine provides structured equity and debt investments in technology and technology-enabled companies. 
 Silver Lake Waterman provides growth capital, via a proprietary growth debt product, to later-stage growth companies in technology and technology-enabled industries.
 Silver Lake Long Term Capital is a long-term strategy that allows a broad mandate to invest in debt and equity across geographies and industries.

References

External links
Silver Lake (company website)

 
Financial services companies of the United States
Financial services companies established in 1999
Companies based in Menlo Park, California
1999 establishments in California
Private equity firms
Private equity firms of the United States